The Cardiff Met Archers are a Welsh basketball club, based in the city of Cardiff, South Wales.

History
The Archers began in 1999 as the student-led university basketball team at University of Wales Institute, Cardiff, competing in the British University Sports Association (BUSA) and the West of England Basketball Association (WEBBA). Now, the Archers' club run 19 teams that range from Under 8s through to seniors, as well as the only Welsh side competing  in the Women's British Basketball League, the highest level of women's basketball in the United Kingdom.

Home venue
The Archers play their home games at the newly-opened Archers Arena on campus at Cardiff Metropolitan University. The arena has capacity for 500 spectators and is also the home of the Welsh national basketball team.

Women

Season-by-season records

Men

Season-by-season records

References

Basketball teams in Wales
Women's basketball teams in Wales
Basketball teams established in 1999
1999 establishments in Wales
Sport in Cardiff
Cardiff Metropolitan University